is a Japanese actress and voice actress from Aichi Prefecture, Japan. She is currently affiliated with Theatre Company Subaru. After the death of Sumiko Shirakawa in 2015, she took over her role as Hiroshi Nakajima in Sazae-san.

Biography
Ochiai was raised in Kanazawa, Nishinomiya and Yokohama and graduated from Yokohama Seiryo High School. She owns a dog named .

Filmography
Shaman King (Sharona)
Z.O.E. Dolores, I (Cindy Fiorentino)
Sonic the Hedgehog games, Sonic X (Rouge the Bat)
Naruto (Kurenai Yuhi)
Naruto: Shippuden (Kurenai Yuhi)
Fullmetal Alchemist (Marin's Mama)
Ragnarok The Animation (Melopsum)
Thomas the Tank Engine and Friends (Daisy, Mrs. Kyndley, Old Slow Coach)
Mao Dante (Lamia)
Boruto: Naruto Next Generations (Kurenai Sarutobi)

Dubbing
Catch Me If You Can (Brenda Strong (Amy Adams))
Criminal Minds: Suspect Behavior (Gina LaSalle (Beau Garrett))
The Family Stone (Amy Stone (Rachel McAdams))
Final Destination (Terry Chaney (Amanda Detmer))
The Karate Kid Part III (Jessica Andrews (Robyn Lively))
The Master (Peggy Dodd (Amy Adams))
Midnight in Paris (Inez (Rachel McAdams))
The Prince & Me (Paige Morgan (Julia Stiles))
Same Kind of Different as Me (Deborah Hall (Renée Zellweger))
Spin City (Ashley Schaeffer (Carla Gugino))
Triangle (Sally (Rachael Carpani))
Wonder Woman 1984 (Barbara Ann Minerva / Cheetah (Kristen Wiig))
You, Me and Dupree (Molly Thompson Peterson (Kate Hudson))

References

External links

1973 births
Living people
Japanese video game actresses
Japanese voice actresses
Voice actresses from Aichi Prefecture